Kraftsdorf is a municipality in the district of Greiz, in Thuringia, Germany. It is dispersed in different municipal units with their sub-set of hamlets:
 Kraftsdorf
 Harpersdorf
 Kraftsdorf
 Oberndorf
 Niederndorf
 Kaltenborn
 Niederndorf
 Rüdersdorf
 Grüna
 Rüdersdorf (with Stübnitz)
 Töppeln
 Mühlsdorf
 Pörsdorf
 Töppeln

See also

References

Municipalities in Thuringia
Greiz (district)